The 1948 United States Senate election in Colorado took place on November 2, 1948. Incumbent Democratic Senator Edwin C. Johnson was re-elected to third term in a landslide over Republican Will Nicholson, a businessman and Air Force veteran, winning every county in the state.

Democratic primary

Candidates
Eugene Cervi, newspaperman and Chairman of the Colorado Democratic Party
Edwin C. Johnson, incumbent Senator since 1933

Results

Republican primary

Candidates
Will Nicholson, owner of the Denver Bears and Air Force veteran
John C. Vivian, former Governor of Colorado from 1943 to 1947

Results

General election

Results

See also 
 1948 United States Senate elections

References 

1948
Colorado
United States Senate